Tano da morire (internationally released as To Die for Tano) is a 1997 Italian musical comedy film written and directed by Roberta Torre. It is loosely inspired by actual life events of Tano Guarrasi, a butcher and a jealous brother of four sisters who was also a little mafia boss and who was killed in his shop in September 1990.

Awards
It entered the 54th Venice International Film Festival, in which it won the FEDIC Award, the Kodak Award and the Luigi De Laurentiis Award for best directorial debut film. The film also won two David di Donatello (for best score and best new director) and three Nastro d'Argento (best score, best new director and best supporting role, an award given to the entire female cast).

Cast
 Ciccio Guarino: Tano Guarrasi
 Mimma de Rosalia: Franca Guarrasi, sister of Tano
 Adele Liotta: sister of Tano
 Mariella Aliotta: sister of Tano
 Annamaria Gonfalone: sister of Tano
 Francesca Di Cesare: Anna 
 Antonina Uzzo: Concetta

References

External links

1997 films
1990s musical comedy films
Italian musical comedy films
1990s Italian-language films
Films set in Palermo
Mafia films
Italian films based on actual events
1997 directorial debut films
1997 comedy films
1990s Italian films